Mimacronia viridimaculata is a species of beetle in the family Cerambycidae. It was described by Stephan von Breuning in 1947, originally under the genus Acronia. It is known from the Philippines.

References

Pteropliini
Beetles described in 1947